Chorvad Road railway station  is a railway station serving in Junagadh district of Gujarat State of India. It is under Bhavnagar railway division of Western Railway Zone of Indian Railways. Passenger and Express trains halt here.

Trains 

The following trains halt at Chorvad Road railway station in both directions:

 22957/58 Ahmedabad - Veraval Somnath Superfast Express
 19119/20 Ahmedabad - Somnath Intercity Express
 19569/70 Rajkot - Veraval Express

References

Railway stations in Junagadh district
Bhavnagar railway division